Cowboys Don't Cry is a Canadian drama film, directed by Anne Wheeler and released in 1988. Based on a novel by Marilyn Halvorson, the film centres on Josh Morgan (Ron White), a rodeo clown, and former rodeo champion whose relationship with his son Shane (Zachary Ansley), is strained after Lucy (Rebecca Jenkins), Josh's wife and Shane's mother, is killed in an accident caused by Josh's drunk driving. After the horrific accident, Josh sinks into depression and self-pity. In the wake of the tragedy of his mother's death, Shane struggles to pick up the pieces and make up for his father's shortcomings. When Shane's grandfather dies, leaving a small ranch in his will, he hopes that his dream of settling down happily in one place, might come true after all. But how can a 14-year-old boy turn the run-down place around and keep the banker from seizing it, while attending school and looking after a father who is usually in the liability column?

Cast

Release 
The film premiered in Calgary, Alberta on February 5, 1988 as part of the cultural festival for the 1988 Winter Olympics, and had theatrical screenings in selected other cities before airing on CBC Television in November.

Awards
The film garnered four Genie Award nominations at the 10th Genie Awards in 1989: Best Actor (Ansley), Best Supporting Actress (Green), Best Director (Wheeler) and Best Original Song (Wheeler and Louis Natale, for "Cowboys Don't Cry"). At the 14th annual Alberta Film and Television Awards, the film was also awarded with best of the festival by four judges contracted by the Alberta Motion Picture Industry Association.

References

External links

1988 films
Canadian drama films
English-language Canadian films
Films shot in Alberta
Films directed by Anne Wheeler
1988 drama films
1980s English-language films
1980s Canadian films